Jeffrey A. Pfaendtner (born February 28, 1967 in Detroit, Michigan) is an American rower.

References 
 
 

1967 births
Living people
American male rowers
Rowers from Detroit
Rowers at the 1996 Summer Olympics
Olympic bronze medalists for the United States in rowing
World Rowing Championships medalists for the United States
Medalists at the 1996 Summer Olympics
Pan American Games medalists in rowing
Pan American Games silver medalists for the United States
Rowers at the 1995 Pan American Games